Katalin L. Vesztergombi (born July 17, 1948) is a Hungarian mathematician known for her contributions to graph theory and discrete geometry. A student of Vera T. Sós and a co-author of Paul Erdős, she is an emeritus associate professor at Eötvös Loránd University and a member of the Hungarian Academy of Sciences.

Education
As a high-school student in the 1960s, Vesztergombi became part of a special class for gifted mathematics students at Fazekas Mihály Gimnázium with her future collaborators László Lovász, József Pelikán, and others. She completed her Ph.D. in 1987 at Eötvös Loránd University. Her dissertation, Distribution of Distances in Finite Point Sets, is connected to the Erdős distinct distances problem and was supervised by Vera Sós.

Contributions
Vesztergombi's research contributions include works on permutations, graph coloring and graph products,
combinatorial discrepancy theory, distance problems in discrete geometry, geometric graph theory,
the rectilinear crossing number of the complete graph, and graphons.

With László Lovász and József Pelikán, she is the author of the textbook Discrete Mathematics: Elementary and Beyond.

Personal
Vesztergombi is married to László Lovász, with whom she is also a frequent research collaborator.

Selected publications

Books

Research articles

References

Living people
20th-century Hungarian mathematicians
21st-century Hungarian mathematicians
Women mathematicians
Graph theorists
Geometers
Academic staff of Eötvös Loránd University
Members of the Hungarian Academy of Sciences
1948 births